Moses Hammond House, also known as the Ragan House, is a historic home in Archdale, Randolph County, North Carolina.  It was built about 1880 and is a two-story, cruciform=plan, Italianate-style frame dwelling.  It has a cross-gable roof with a front projecting bay with flanking decorative one-story frame porches.  Also on the property is a barn. The house was adapted for use as a branch bank in 1988.

The building with the barn contributing was added to the National Register of Historic Places in 1989.

References

Houses on the National Register of Historic Places in North Carolina
Italianate architecture in North Carolina
Houses completed in 1880
Houses in Randolph County, North Carolina
National Register of Historic Places in Randolph County, North Carolina